The following lists events that happened during 1886 in South Africa.

Incumbents
 Governor of the Cape of Good Hope and High Commissioner for Southern Africa: Hercules Robinson.
 Governor of the Colony of Natal: Henry Ernest Gascoyne Bulwer.
 State President of the Orange Free State: Jan Brand.
 State President of the South African Republic: Paul Kruger.
 Prime Minister of the Cape of Good Hope: Thomas Upington (until 24 November), John Gordon Sprigg (starting 24 November).

Events
September
 The main gold reef on the Witwatersrand is discovered, giving birth to Ferreira's Camp, later to be named Johannesburg.

October
 11 – The Standard Bank of South Africa opens the first bank in Ferreira's Camp.

Births
 2 January – Billy Zulch, South African cricketer (d. 1924)
 13 December – Henry Selby Msimang, political activist, journalist, court interpreter and lay preacher, is born in Edendale, Pietermaritzburg.

Deaths
 1 September – Sir John Charles Molteno, first Prime Minister of the Cape Colony.

Railways

Railway lines opened

 21 June – Natal – Estcourt to Ladysmith, .

Locomotives
 The first of three 0-4-0 well-tank condensing locomotives is placed in service by the Cape Copper Mining Company on its  narrow gauge Namaqualand Railway between Port Nolloth and O'okiep in the Cape Colony. They are the first condensing steam locomotives in South Africa.

References

History of South Africa